The Super Aguri SA07 was Super Aguri F1's Formula One car for the 2007 Formula One season. It was designed by Peter McCool and was driven by Takuma Sato and Anthony Davidson.

Customer car protests

The 2007 Super Aguri was based on a re-worked RA106 chassis used by Honda F1 in the 2006 Formula One season. It was the basis of a complaint filed by Spyker F1 against Super Aguri F1.  It is believed that the protest is related to articles 2.1, 2.2 and 6.3 of the F1 sporting regulations.  Article 6.3 of the F1 sporting regulations states: "The constructor of an engine or rolling chassis is the person (including any corporate or unincorporated body) which owns the intellectual property rights to such engine or chassis." Since Super Aguri owned the intellectual property rights, they claimed that the car was within the rules. Indeed, the Honda F1 RA106 was sold to PJUU Inc, and Super Aguri F1 acquired the rights through them and thereafter modified the package to meet the technical regulations for the 2007 season.

There was also another issue of the team's possible violation of the Concorde Agreement. Both Spyker and Williams claimed that Super Aguri (and both Red Bull teams) had broken Schedule 3 of the Agreement which states: "A constructor is a person (including any incorporated or unincorporated body) who owns the intellectual property rights to the rolling chassis it currently races, and does not incorporate in such chassis any part designed or manufactured by any other constructor of F1 racing cars except for standard items of safety equipment, providing that nothing in the Schedule 3 shall prevent the use of an engine or gearbox manufactured by a person other than the constructor of the chassis." Spyker and Williams believed that if the SA07 did indeed use components designed by Honda, they would be in violation of the Concorde Agreement. , the issue had yet to be clarified and the FIA is not permitted to take action against a team curtailing the Concorde Agreement until the issue has been resolved in a court of law. Super Aguri maintained their innocence in this issue, though the matter was still of great contention.

Race history
The car performed extremely well compared to its predecessor the SA06. In qualifying for the Australian Grand Prix, both drivers comfortably made it through the first knockout stage - a first for the team - and Takuma Sato managed to get through to the final ten. In race pace, the car performed less favourably, but still catapulted Super Aguri off the back row of the grid. In Spain they scored their first ever point after Takuma Sato finished in eighth but only after Nick Heidfeld fell to the wayside due to a pit stop error and a high attrition rate. Two races later, in Canada, Sato scored another three points in an incident-filled Grand Prix, overtaking World Champion Fernando Alonso in the process, while Davidson ran strongly, on a one-stopper, in 3rd place, before he hit a groundhog, which forced him to stop and drop out of the points.  The car had frequently been more competitive than parent team Honda's RA107, although the factory Honda team finished ahead in the Constructors' Championship with 6 points, compared to Super Aguri's 4.

Super Aguri SA07B 
During winter testing for the 2008 season, Super Aguri used a B version of the SA07, which had been brought into compliance with the 2008 technical regulations. The SA07B was driven by the team's two incumbent drivers, Sato and Davidson.

Complete Formula One results
(key) (results in bold indicate pole position)

References

Super Aguri Formula One cars
2007 Formula One season cars